The Andrews Subdivision is a railroad line owned by CSX Transportation in North Carolina and South Carolina. The line is a former Seaboard Air Line Railroad line that runs from Hamlet, North Carolina, to Charleston, South Carolina, for a total of 156.6 miles. At its north end it continues south from the Hamlet Terminal Subdivision and at its south end it connects to CSX's A Line (Charleston Subdivision).

History
The first segment of the Andrews Subdivision to be built was the segment from Hamlet to Gibson, North Carolina.  This segment was built in 1884 by the Raleigh and Augusta Air Line Railroad (the Aberdeen Subdivision north of Hamlet is also part of this line).  The Raleigh and Augusta Air Line Railroad became part of the Seaboard Air Line Railway (later known as the Seaboard Air Line Railroad) in 1901.  

In 1915, track was extended south of Gibson into South Carolina by the North and South Carolina Railway, which would become the Carolina, Atlantic and Western Railroad.  The line was extended south to Andrews and Charleston, South Carolina.  By the end of 1915, the Seaboard Air Line acquired the Carolina, Atlantic and Western Railroad.

The Seaboard Air Line designated the line as the Andrews Subdivision from Hamlet to Andrews, and the Charleston Subdivision south of Andrews to Charleston.  

In 1918, the line was extended as far south as Savannah, Georgia, where it reconnected with the Seaboard Air Line's main line.  This final extension ran through the coastal marshes of coastal South Carolina via Lobeco, Levy, and Hutchinson Island.  This extension essentially made the full line from Hamlet to Savannah an alternate route for the Seabord's main line, which was much further inland.  It was also a more direct route between Charleston and Savannah than the SAL's competitor, the Atlantic Coast Line Railroad, whose main line between the two cities was located a short distance to the west.  Much of SAL's through freight was then rerouted to this line since it was flatter, therefore making it better suited for freight than the main line.  

In 1967, the Seaboard Air Line (SAL) merged with the Atlantic Coast Line (ACL) to form the Seaboard Coast Line Railroad (SCL).  A few months after the merger, the Seaboard Coast Line abandoned the ex-SAL line south of Charleston to Lobeco due to its proximity to the ex-ACL main line (track south of Lobeco was left in service until in 1978 and was then known as the Coosaw Subdivision).

After the line south of Charleston was abandoned, the Andrews Subdivision designation was extended south to Charleston as it is today.  The Charleston Subdivision name was then reused for the A Line (ex-ACL main line) as it is today.

See also
 List of CSX Transportation lines
 North and South Carolina Railway

References

External links
Miscellaneous Railroads in South Carolina (1910 Map)
CSX - Andrews Subdivision - Cooper and Santee River Bridges (YouTube)
Andrews Subdivision (AN) Station List and Diagram (RAILFAN GUIDE; CSX Divisions (live site)) 

CSX Transportation lines
Rail infrastructure in North Carolina
Rail infrastructure in South Carolina